The American Society of Addiction Medicine (ASAM),  founded in 1954, is a professional medical society representing over 7,000 physicians, clinicians and associated professionals in the field of addiction medicine. ASAM is dedicated to increasing access and improving the quality of addiction treatment, educating physicians and the public, supporting research and prevention, and promoting the appropriate role of physicians in the care of patients with addiction.

References 

Medical associations based in the United States
Addiction organizations in the United States
Organizations established in 1954
1954 establishments in New York (state)
Non-profit organizations based in Maryland
Organizations based in the Baltimore–Washington metropolitan area
Chevy Chase, Maryland
Medical and health organizations based in Maryland
501(c)(3) organizations